The George F. Bensel House is a historic residence built in 1912 in Jacksonville, Florida. It was designed by Wilbur B. Talley. Bensel, president of Southern States Land & Timber, was the original owner. The house is located at 2165 River Boulevard and is considered to be in the prairie architecture style.

References

Further reading
 Broward, Robert C.: The Architecture of Henry John Klutho: The Prairie School in Jacksonville. Jacksonville, Florida: The Jacksonville Historical Society, 2003.
 Wood, Wayne W.: Jacksonville's Architectural Heritage: Landmarks for the Future. Gainesville, Florida: University Press of Florida, 1996.

Houses in Jacksonville, Florida
Houses completed in 1912
Prairie School architecture in Florida
1912 establishments in Florida